Sympistis hapi is a moth of the family Noctuidae first described by James T. Troubridge in 2008. It is found in the US state of Colorado.

The wingspan is 26–31 mm.

References

hapi
Moths described in 2008